Orlovo is a rural locality (a village) in Vakhnevskoye Rural Settlement, Nikolsky District, Vologda Oblast, Russia. The population was 35 as of 2002.

Geography 
Orlovo is located 55 km northwest of Nikolsk (the district's administrative centre) by road. Osinovaya Gar is the nearest rural locality.

References 

Rural localities in Nikolsky District, Vologda Oblast